Abernant is an unincorporated community in Tuscaloosa County, Alabama, United States. Abernant has a post office with ZIP code 35440.

Shares a name with Welsh settlements of Abernant, Rhondda Cynon Taf, Abernant, Powys and Abernant, Carmarthenshire. In the Welsh language, “Aber” is translated as Estuary and “Nant” is translated as Stream.

History
Abernant was named for a local family which also lent their name to a nearby coal company. A post office has been in operation at Abernant since 1902.

Demographics

Abernant Census Division (1960-)

Abernant village has never reported a population figure separately on the U.S. Census as an unincorporated community. However, the census division formed in 1960 was named for Abernant (superseding the former name of Parsons-Yolande, Precinct 12 of Tuscaloosa County)).

References

Unincorporated communities in Tuscaloosa County, Alabama
Unincorporated communities in Alabama